Ale Municipality (Ale kommun) is a municipality in Västra Götaland County in western Sweden. Its seat is located in the town of Nödinge-Nol, more precisely in Alafors at 

Ale Municipality was created in 1974, when the former municipalities of Nödinge, Skepplanda and Starrkärr were amalgamated. The new entity got its name from the old Ale Hundred, which had approximately the same territory.

It built one of the first indoor bandy arenas in Sweden (and subsequently in the world), which was the first in Götaland, located in Bohuslän.

Localities
Inhabitants figures from 2020.

Nödinge-Nol 11,500 (seat)
Surte 6,400
Älvängen 6,100
Skepplanda 1,900
Alvhem 400

Politics
Result of the 2006 election (Turnout 81,71% 15717):
 Moderate Party 21,24%
 Centre Party 6,95%
 Liberals (Sweden) 7,24%
 Christian Democrats 7,10%
 Swedish Social Democratic Party 40,01%
 Left Party 7,15%
 Green Party 4,19%
 Sweden Democrats 3,93%
 Other Parties 2,17%

Result of the 2010 election (Turnout 85,01% 17140 +4,30%):
 Moderate Party 28,22% 	
 Centre party 4,97% 	
 Liberals (Sweden) 6,47% 	
 Christian Democrats 5,78% 	
 Swedish Social Democratic Party 33,00% 	
 Left Party 6,08% 	
 Green Party 5,99% 	
 Sweden Democrats 8,09%
 Feminist Initiative 0,50%
 Other Parties 0,90%

Result of the 2014 election (Turnout 86,18% +1,17%, Votes 18094):
 Moderate Party 22,19%
 Centre Party 5,10%
 Liberals (Sweden) 4,35%
 Christian Democrats 4,36%
 Swedish Social Democratic Party 32,34%
 Left Party 6,30%
 Green Party 5,63%
 Sweden Democrats 16,25%
 Feminist Initiative 2,51%
 Other Parties 0,96%

Sister cities
Ale has two sister cities:
 Bertinoro, Italy
 Kaufungen, Germany

References

External links

Ale Municipality - Official site

Municipalities of Västra Götaland County
North Älvsborg
Metropolitan Gothenburg